Vincent Salyers is an American professor of nursing. He is best known for his contributions to intersections between technology, curriculum design, clinical practice and inter-professional education.

Salyers earned his BS in psychology and his MS in nursing at San Francisco State University, and he earned his doctorate from the University of San Francisco.

Prior to joining the faculty at Gonzaga University, where he was the Dean of School of Nursing and Human Physiology, Salyers was the inaugural dean of the Faculty of Nursing at MacEwan University. Salyers held previous positions on the faculty and administration of a number of universities in the United States and Canada including as associate dean of the Faculty of Health, Community & Education at Mount Royal University in Calgary.

In 2014, Salyers was inducted as a Fellow of the Academy of Nursing Education of the National League for Nursing, and in 2019 he was inducted as a Fellow of the American Academy of Nursing.

References

External links 

 Google Scholar

American nurses
Living people
Fellows of the American Academy of Nursing
Year of birth missing (living people)